Wadshelf is a small village in Derbyshire, England. It is located between Chesterfield and Baslow, just inside the Peak District national park. It is near to Wigley, Holymoorside, and Brampton. The name is believed to be a corruption of Watch Hill. The village has a pub, The Highwayman on the main A619 road. Wadshelf is in the civil parish of Brampton.

References

External links

Villages in Derbyshire
Towns and villages of the Peak District
North East Derbyshire District